Christopher Herrys or Harris (1599-1628), of Islington, Middlesex and Lincoln's Inn, London, was an English Member of Parliament.

He was a Member (MP) of the Parliament of England for Harwich in 1624, 1625, 1626 and 
1628.

References

1599 births
1628 deaths
17th-century English people
People from Islington (district)
People of the Stuart period
Members of Lincoln's Inn
Members of the Parliament of England (pre-1707)